Robert Lewin was an art dealer and philanthropist.

Robert Lewin may also refer to:

Robert Lewin (chiropractor)
Robert Lewin (screenwriter)